Ernestine Lutze (17 June 1873 – 27 April 1948) was a German trade unionist and politician. In 1919 she was one of the 36 women elected to the Weimar National Assembly, the first female parliamentarians in Germany. She remained a member of parliament until the following year.

Biography
Lutze was born Ernestine Elsterwerda in Merzdorf in 1873. She attended primary school in Dresden and Großenhain, and began working as a maid aged nine. She later became a florist and a board member of the Flower Worker's Association and married painter Karl Otto Lutze. In 1911 she attended trade union school in Berlin. Back in Dresden, she became a committee member of the regional health insurance fund and in 1917 was appointed to Dresden City Council's housing committee. After the outbreak of the German Revolution in 1918, she became a member of the city's Workers' and Soldiers' Council.

Having been a speaker for the Social Democratic Party (SPD) for several years, in January 1919 she was elected to the Weimar National Assembly from the Saxony I constituency as a representative of the SPD. She lost her seat in the 1920 Reichstag elections. In 1926 she joined the new Old Social Democratic Party, becoming a member of the executive committee of the party's East Saxony branch. Between 1926 and 1929 she served as a city councillor in Dresden.

She died in Dresden in 1948.

References

1873 births
Politicians from Dresden
German trade unionists
Social Democratic Party of Germany politicians
Members of the Weimar National Assembly
Old Social Democratic Party of Germany politicians
1948 deaths
20th-century German women politicians